MapR was a business software company headquartered in Santa Clara, California. MapR software provides access to a variety of data sources from a single computer cluster, including big data workloads such as Apache Hadoop and Apache Spark, a distributed file system, a multi-model database management system,  and event stream processing, combining analytics in real-time with operational applications. Its technology runs on both commodity hardware and public cloud computing services. In August 2019, following financial difficulties, the technology and intellectual property of the company were sold to Hewlett Packard Enterprise.

Funding 
MapR was privately held with original funding of $9 million from Lightspeed Venture Partners and New Enterprise Associates in 2009. MapR executives come from Google, Lightspeed Venture Partners, Informatica, EMC Corporation and Veoh.  MapR had an additional round of funding led by Redpoint Ventures in August, 2011.  A round in 2013 was led by Mayfield Fund that also included Greenspring Associates.  In June 2014, MapR closed a $110 million financing round that was led by Google Capital.  Qualcomm Ventures also participated, along with existing investors Lightspeed Venture Partners, Mayfield Fund, New Enterprise Associates and Redpoint Ventures.

In May 2019, the company announced that it would shut down if it was unable to find additional funding.

History

The company contributed to the Apache Hadoop projects HBase, Pig, Apache Hive, and Apache ZooKeeper.

MapR entered a technology licensing agreement with EMC Corporation on 2011, supporting an EMC-specific distribution of Apache Hadoop.  MapR was selected by Amazon Web Services to provide an upgraded version of Amazon's Elastic MapReduce (EMR) service. MapR broke the minute sort speed record on Google's Compute platform.

See also

 Apache Accumulo
 Apache Software Foundation
 Big data
 Bigtable
 Database-centric architecture
 Hadoop
 MapReduce
 HBase
 RainStor

References

External links 
 MapR Homepage

Software companies based in the San Francisco Bay Area
Cloud infrastructure
Distributed file systems
Hadoop
Companies based in San Jose, California
Big data companies
Defunct software companies of the United States